Nice to Be Around is Maureen McGovern's second studio album, released in 1974. The title track was the theme from the 1973 film Cinderella Liberty. McGovern composed the music for the songs "All I Want (All I Need)," "Love Knots," "Little Boys & Men" (dedicated to Mark Christopher Axelson), and "Memory."

Track listing

Album credits
Produced by: Carl Maduri for Belkin-Maduri Productions
Engineer: Arnie Rosenberg
Assistant engineer: John Nebe
"Nice to Be Around" and "Little Boys & Men" arranged by: Jimmie Haskell
"Give Me a Reason to Be Gone," "Where Did We Go Wrong," "Like a Sunday Morning" and "Put a Little Love Away" arranged by: Gene Page
"All I Want (All I Need)," "Love Knots" and "Memory" arranged and conducted by: Gary Kekel
"Nice to Be Around," "Like a Sunday Morning" and "Little Boys & Men" conducted by: Sid Sharp
"Give Me a Reason to Be Gone," "Where Did We Go Wrong," "Like a Sunday Morning" and "Put a Little Love Away" conducted by: Bob Hill
"Everybody Wants to Call You Sweetheart" arranged and conducted by: Lee Bush

1974 albums
Maureen McGovern albums
Albums arranged by Jimmie Haskell
Albums arranged by Gene Page
20th Century Fox Records albums